Chris Handsor (born January 14, 1972) is a Canadian former soccer player who played outdoor and indoor primarily in the USL A-League, National Professional Soccer League, and the Canadian Professional Soccer League.

Playing career 
Handsor began his professional career in the Canadian National Soccer League in 1995 with the St. Catharines Wolves. In his debut season with St. Catharines he would achieve a treble – winning the Umbro Cup, League Championship, and League Playoff Championship. At the conclusion of the season he was awarded the CNSL MVP award. In 1996, he signed with the Charleston Battery of the USISL Pro League. During his tenure with Charleston he failed to feature in a single appearance; resulting in Handsor to return to the CNSL to sign with the Toronto Supra . With Supra he repeated his treble success winning all three trophies throughout the season. The following season, he signed with the Toronto Olympians of the newly formed Canadian Professional Soccer League.

He assisted the Olympians in achieving an undefeated season, and secured a double by winning the Open Canada Cup. The club lost out in the playoffs to his former club St. Catharines, losing in penalties. In 1999, he returned to the USL A-League to sign with the Atlanta Silverbacks, making 17 appearances and scoring 1 goal. When the USL season concluded he returned to the CPSL to re-sign with the Olympians. He won his second Open Canada Cup with the organization by contributing a goal in a 3-0 victory over Toronto Croatia. Toronto once more went undefeated and clinched a postseason berth, in the playoff finals Handsor scored the winning goal in a 2-0 victory over Toronto Croatia.  In 2000, Handsor was relegated to the bench for the majority of the season which led to his transfer to Toronto Croatia. He made his debut on August 18, 2000 against Toronto Olympians. He reached the playoff finals where he would face his former club the Toronto Olympians, where Croatia would win the match by a score of 2-1, marking his second CPSL Championship.

On April 24, 2001 the Vancouver Whitecaps announced the signing of Handsor for the 2001 USL A-League season. Unfortuanelty he wouldn't feature much as he suffered a groin injury keeping him out for most of the season. In 2004, he signed with newly expansion franchise the Edmonton Aviators. Midway through the season he was transferred to the Toronto Lynx, and made his debut on July 25, 2004 in a match against Calgary Mustangs.

Indoor career 
Handsor had stints in the National Professional Soccer League, and the Major Indoor Soccer League. He played with Cleveland Crunch, Philadelphia KiXX, Toronto Shooting Stars, Edmonton Drillers, Buffalo Blizzard, Kansas City Comets, Baltimore Blast, Cleveland Force, Chicago Storm, and California Cougars.

Achievements
Toronto Olympians
CPSL Championship (1): 1999
Open Canada Cup (2): 1998, 1999
Canadian Professional Soccer League Regular Season Champions (2): 1998, 1999
Toronto Croatia
CPSL Championship (1): 2000

References

1972 births
Living people
Association football defenders
Atlanta Silverbacks players
Baltimore Blast players
Buffalo Blizzard players
California Cougars players
Canadian National Soccer League players
Canadian Soccer League (1998–present) players
Canadian soccer players
Canadian expatriate soccer players
Expatriate soccer players in the United States
Canadian expatriate sportspeople in the United States
Charleston Battery players
Chicago Storm (MISL) players
Cleveland Crunch (NPSL) players
Cleveland Force (2002–2005 MISL) players
Edmonton Aviators / F.C. players
Edmonton Drillers (1996–2000) players
Kansas City Comets (2001–2005 MISL) players
National Professional Soccer League (1984–2001) players
Philadelphia KiXX (NPSL) players
St. Catharines Roma Wolves players
SC Toronto players
Soccer players from Toronto
Toronto Croatia players
Toronto Lynx players
Toronto (Mississauga) Olympians players
Toronto Shooting Stars players
Vancouver Whitecaps (1986–2010) players
A-League (1995–2004) players